Ronald Chester Kichline (January 4, 1895 – January 20, 1956) was an American football and basketball coach. He served as the head football coach (1916 1920) and head men's basketball coach (1917-1920) at Mansfield University of Pennsylvania. Kichline spent the 1921–22 academic year serving in the same roles at Juniata College in Huntingdon, Pennsylvania. He spent the final years of his college coaching career as the head football coach his alma mater, Ursinus College in Collegeville, Pennsylvania, from 1925 to 1930. After retiring from college coach, he work in the insurance industry and as a teacher. He was an interim head coach at Reading Senior High School in Reading, Pennsylvania while their regular coach was serving in World War II.

Head coaching record

College football

References

External links
 

1895 births
1956 deaths
Basketball coaches from Pennsylvania
Juniata Eagles football coaches
Mansfield Mounties football coaches
Mansfield Mountaineers men's basketball coaches
Juniata Eagles men's basketball coaches
Ursinus Bears football coaches
Ursinus Bears football players
Sportspeople from Northampton County, Pennsylvania
Players of American football from Pennsylvania